"Nasty Girl" is a song by American rapper Nitty. It is the third track on his second studio album, Player's Paradise (2005), and was released as the album's second single on August 30, 2004. Despite failing to enter the top 75 in the United States, it reached number one in Australia for two weeks and peaked within the top 40 in Austria, Denmark, Germany, and Switzerland. It received a platinum sales certification in Australia and a gold certification in the US.

Composition
There are four verses, including three similar verses and a different final verse. The chorus of the song is an interpolation of the 1969 hit song "Sugar, Sugar" by the Archies.

Music video
The music video features Nitty driving a red Cadillac convertible to a gas station. Here, two girls fill his car while Nitty begins to sing.

Track listings

US CD single
 "Nasty Girl" (main) – 4:00
 "Nasty Girl" (instrumental) – 4:05
 "Nasty Girl" (acappella) – 4:07
 Call out hook – 0:20

European CD single
 "Nasty Girl" – 4:00
 "Wind It Up" – 4:01

Australian CD single
 "Nasty Girl" – 4:00
 "Nasty Girl" (Lift remix) – 5:22
 "Wind It Up" – 4:01
 "Nasty Girl" (video)

Credits and personnel
Credits are lifted from the US CD single liner notes.

Studios
 Recorded at Nezz Studios (The Bronx, New York) and Integrated Studios (New York City)
 Mixed at Integrated Studios (New York City)

Personnel

 Frank Ross (Nitty) – writing, vocals, background vocals, drums, production, programming
 Jeff Barry – writer of "Sugar, Sugar"
 Andy Kim – writer of "Sugar, Sugar"
 Michael Moog – background vocals, co-production
 Maria Taylor – background vocals

 Adam Podrat – guitar
 Jesse Graham – bass
 Robert "Nezz" Martinez – drums, production, programming, recording
 Josh Brochhausen – recording, mixing
 Derek Pacuk – mixing

Charts

Weekly charts

Year-end charts

Certifications

Release history

References

2004 singles
2004 songs
Nitty (musician) songs
Number-one singles in Australia
Songs written by Andy Kim
Songs written by Jeff Barry
Universal Music Group singles